Luca Carretto (born 10 August 1984 in Rivoli) is an Italian footballer.  He currently plays for RapalloBogliasco.

References

F.C. Canavese players
F.C.D. Lottogiaveno players
1984 births
Living people
Italian footballers
Association football central defenders